Ga-in is a Korean female given name.

People with this name include:
Han Ga-in (born 1982), South Korean actress
Song Ga-in (born 1986), South Korean trot singer, Miss Trot season 1 winner
Son Ga-in (born 1987), South Korean singer and actress, member of Brown Eyed Girls

See also

List of Korean given names

Korean feminine given names